Bailyn is both a surname and a given name. Notable people with the name include:

Bernard Bailyn (1922–2020), American historian, author, and academic
Charles Bailyn (born 1959), American astrophysicist
Bailyn Sullivan (born 1998), New Zealand rugby union player

See also
Baily (surname)